The Cuatetes de Acapulco Fútbol Club, commonly known as Cuatetes, was a Mexican football club based in Acapulco. The club was founded in 2016, and played in the Serie B of Liga Premier.

Players

Current squad

References 

Association football clubs established in 2016
2016 establishments in Mexico
Liga Premier de México
Association football clubs disestablished in 2018
2018 disestablishments in Mexico